White Flags of Winter Chimneys is a 2008 album by Wendy & Lisa. It is their fifth studio album (and to date, their last) and was released on December 9, 2008. The album was written, played, and produced all by Wendy Melvoin and Lisa Coleman.

It was the band's first album in nearly a decade. Melvoin and Coleman were focused on creating musical scores for the television show Heroes, and wrote the album while the show was briefly on hiatus due to a writer's strike. 

The title is taken from a lyric in the Joni Mitchell song, "Hejira".

Track listing
All songs written by Wendy Melvoin and Lisa Coleman.
"Balloon" – 4:20
"Invisible" – 4:57
"Ever After" – 3:54
"Salt & Cherries (MC5)" – 4:04
" Falls" – 4:07
"Red Bike" – 4:49
"You and I" – 2:55
"White Flags of Winter Chimneys" – 4:10
"Sweet Suite (Beginning at the End)" – 8:41

Digital-only bonus tracks
"Niagara Falls" (Lisa Demo 4_1_1997) – 5:17
"The Dream" (1992 home demo) – 4:58
"Viste" (1993 Happy Birthday Maxine home recording) – 4:30
"Waiting for Coffee" (1995 home demo) – 4:03

References

Wendy & Lisa albums
2008 albums